Prague is a city in Lincoln County, Oklahoma, United States. The population was 2,346 at the 2020 census, an 1.76 percent decrease from the figure of 2,388 in 2010. Czech immigrants founded the city, and named it after the capital of the present-day Czech Republic.

History
After the opening of the Sac and Fox Reservation by a land run on September 22, 1891, Czech immigrants settled and founded Prague. Eva Barta owned the land, and named the new town "Prague" for the Czech capital in Europe, then part of Austria-Hungary. The town incorporated in 1902. The town's name has been adopted in Sac and Fox language as Pwêkeki.

On March 27, 1943, the film Hangmen Also Die! had its world premiere in Prague in an event which featured Adolf Hitler, Hirohito and Mussolini being hanged in effigy on Main Street. The town of Prague was apparently chosen because the movie is loosely based on the 1942 assassination of Reinhard Heydrich, the Nazi Reich Protector of the German-occupied city of Prague, now in the Czech Republic.  After the premiere, the film opened nationwide in the first days of April, beginning with 20 key cities.

On May 24, 1952, a head-on automobile collision seriously injured Indian mystic Meher Baba near Prague. The accident site has become a place of pilgrimage for world wide Meher Baba followers.  

An F5 tornado tore through Prague on May 5, 1960.

For 1996 Summer Olympics, the torch was carried through the town of Prague in order to commemorate the legacy of the legendary Sac and Fox native Olympic athlete, Jim Thorpe, who was born and raised in this region.

On November 5, 2011 a series of earthquakes struck near Prague, the first one a magnitude 4.7 at 2:15 a.m. CST, followed by a series of aftershocks, and then a second quake of magnitude 5.7 at 10:53 p.m. CST, the strongest recorded in Oklahoma history until a 5.8-magnitude earthquake occurred on September 3, 2016. This continued on November 7, 2011 when another 4.7 hit at 8:45 p.m., just five miles northwest of Prague.

Geography
Prague is located at  (35.486092, -96.687792).

Demographics

As of the census of 2000, there were 2,138 people, 864 households, and 567 families residing in the city. The population density was 1,211.6 people per square mile (469.0/km). There were 1,021 housing units at an average density of 578.6 per square mile (224.0/km). The racial makeup of the city was 83.07% White, 3.70% African American, 9.92% Native American, 0.33% Asian, 0.09% from other races, and 2.90% from two or more races. Hispanic or Latino of any race were 1.12% of the population.

There were 864 households, out of which 31.9% had children under the age of 18 living with them, 49.9% were married couples living together, 11.6% had a female householder with no husband present, and 34.3% were non-families. 30.9% of all households were made up of individuals, and 17.0% had someone living alone who was 65 years of age or older. The average household size was 2.34 and the average family size was 2.91.

In the city, the population was spread out, with 25.3% under the age of 18, 7.8% from 18 to 24, 27.6% from 25 to 44, 19.9% from 45 to 64, and 19.4% who were 65 years of age or older. The median age was 39 years. For every 100 females, there were 84.2 males. For every 100 females age 18 and over, there were 81.9 males.

The median income for a household in the city was $26,779, and the median income for a family was $32,137. Males had a median income of $24,083 versus $19,438 for females. The per capita income for the city was $14,381. About 11.3% of families and 17.0% of the population were below the poverty line, including 17.4% of those under age 18 and 15.9% of those age 65 or over.

Newspapers

The Shawnee News Star and the Prague Times Herald, provide news coverage of Prague.

The Oklahomski Noviny was a Czech-language newspaper printed in Prague in the 20th century.

Education
The Prague Public Schools serve approximately 1000 students.

Economy
Agriculture, with corn as the primary crop, initially drove Prague's economy. This was still true at the beginning of the 21st century. Industry and commerce began to contribute later.

Government
Prague has a council-manager form of city government.

Transportation
Prague is at the intersection of U.S. Routes 377 and 62, and is approximately 10 minutes north of Interstate 40.

The Prague-owned Prague Municipal Airport (FAA Identifier—O47) is two miles west of town, and features a 3600’ asphalt runway.

Culture
On the first Saturday of May each year there is a 'Kolache Festival'. It celebrates the Czech culture brought from the 'old country.' One can learn more at the Prague Historical Museum on the town's main street, Jim Thorpe Boulevard, which is named for the town's most famous son, Sac and Fox Tribe member, the Olympic athlete Jim Thorpe. 

Reflecting its Czech Catholic heritage, Prague is also the home of a Papal-authorized copy of the Infant Jesus of Prague, known as the National Shrine of the Infant Jesus, which draws numerous visitors each year.

Notable people
Jim Thorpe (1887–1953), athlete, the first Native American Olympic gold medalist
Olinka Hrdy (1902–1987), artist
Orville Edwin Langley (1908–1973), U.S. District Judge for Eastern Oklahoma (1965-1973)
Richard James (1926–2013), lawyer and legislator
Walter E. Fountain (born 1961), United States Army officer
Kyle Denney (born 1977), baseball player
 Andrew "Ace" Walker (born 1983), baseball player and artist

NRHP sites

The following sites in Prague are listed on the National Register of Historic Places:
Prague City Hall and Jail
ZCBJ Lodge No. 46, also known as Bohemian Hall

References

External links
 City of Prague, Oklahoma
 Oklahoma Digital Maps: Digital Collections of Oklahoma and Indian Territory
 Tower, William Ray. "A General History of the Town of Prague, Oklahoma 1908 - 1948."
 Flag of Prague, Oklahoma

Oklahoma City metropolitan area
Cities in Lincoln County, Oklahoma
Cities in Oklahoma
Czech-American culture in Oklahoma
1902 establishments in Oklahoma Territory